is a former Japanese football player.

Playing career
Ishida was born in Yokohama on August 31, 1979. After graduating from Junior high school, he moved to Brazil in 1995 and played many clubs. In 1998, he returned to Japan and joined J1 League club Shimizu S-Pulse. On October 24, he debuted against Bellmare Hiratsuka. However he could hardly play in the match until 1999. After 1 year blank, he joined Tokyo Verdy in 2001. However he could not play at all in the match.

In June 2001, he moved to Singapore and joined Clementi Khalsa. He played many matches until October 2001.

In October 2001, he moved to Australia and joined Olympic Sharks (later Sydney Olympic). He played in the first season of the A-League for Perth Glory coming from Sydney Olympic. Not long after the 05/06 season had finished he went to pursue his playing career in Malaysia after the Perth Glory changed its ownership over to the FFA.

After a brief stop at Johor FC in Malaysia, he moved to Japan's J1 League side Ventforet Kofu in June 2006. However he could not play at all in the match. In 2007, he moved to J2 League side Sagan Tosu and played in 2 seasons. After a half year blank, he joined Prefectural Leagues side Fujieda MYFC in the summer of 2009. He played as regular player and the club was promoted to Regional Leagues from 2010 and Japan Football League from 2012. However his opportunity to play decreased from 2012 and he retired end of 2013 season.

During his time at Sydney Olympic, Hiroyuki Ishida was a firm fan favourite. Ishida was known for his outstanding pace and dribbling skills on the wing, willingly pressuring the opposition; which is why the Olympic fans adored him so much. During his time at Olympic, Ishida claimed the NSL (National Soccer League) Championship in the 2001–2002 season, as well as the NSL Minor Premiership and the NSL Runners-up in 2002–2003.

Club statistics

References

External links

 Sydney Olympic player stats

1979 births
Living people
Association football people from Kanagawa Prefecture
Japanese footballers
Japanese expatriate footballers
Expatriate footballers in Singapore
Expatriate soccer players in Australia
Expatriate footballers in Malaysia
Japanese expatriate sportspeople in Malaysia
J1 League players
J2 League players
Japan Football League players
Singapore Premier League players
A-League Men players
National Soccer League (Australia) players
Shimizu S-Pulse players
Tokyo Verdy players
Balestier Khalsa FC players
Sydney Olympic FC players
Perth Glory FC players
Ventforet Kofu players
Sagan Tosu players
Fujieda MYFC players
Association football midfielders